There were fourteen judo events at the 2018 South American Games in Cochabamba, Bolivia. Seven for men and seven for women. The events were held between May 27 and 30 at the Coliseo José Villazón.

Medal summary

Medal table

Men's events

Women's events

References

2018 South American Games events
American Games, South
2018